Khimprom Novocheboksarsk is a chemicals-producing company based in Novocheboksarsk, Russia. It is part of Orgsintez Group (Renova).

The Novocheboksarsk Khimprom Production Association is a giant facility whose Production Facility No. 3 manufactured chemical agents between 1972 and 1987. The plant is now making preparations to destroy chemical weapons and agents while continuing to produce household chemicals and fertilizers.

The company used to manufacture organophosphorus nerve agents, and as of 2013 still produced dual-use chemicals. It produced Soviet V-gas until 1987, and still manufactures phosphorus oxychloride, phosphorus trichloride, and dimethyl phosphite, and phosphorus-based insecticides, herbicides and dyestuffs.

Products 
As of June 2022 the company has listed the following chemical compounds that it's been producing at the time:

 Antioxidant С-789 (for rubber industry)
 Acetonanil H (2,2,4-Trimethyl-1,2-dihydroquinoline)

 Benzamine N, (epoxy curing agent)

 Bifurgin

 Hydrogen peroxide
 Sodium hydrosulfide

 Calcium hypochlorite
 Sodium hypochlorite  
 Diphenylguanidine (vulcanazing agent in rubber industry)
 Hydrophobicity-inducing liquids (probably Bis(trimethylsilyl)amine)
 Calcium hydroxide (CaOH)
 Calcium chloride (CaCl, liquid)
 2-Ethylhexanoic acid

 Hydrogen chloride (HCl)
 Organic silica gels (used in oil drilling industry to secure borehole stability)
 Silicon tetrachloride:

 Organic silica varnishes
 Dichloromethane   

 Sodium hydroxide (NaOH)
 Polyethylene glycol ethers 

 Chlorinated paraffins

 Polyamine 
 Additives for mineral oils
 Organic silica risings
 Poly(methylphenylsiloxane)-based resings at different dilutions leves 
 Isopropyl alcohol
 Isopropyl alcohol-based antiseptics in mixtures with parrafins (75%/25%)   
 Tetraethyl orthosilicate
 Trichlorosilane
 Carbon tetrachloride
 Trichlorophenylsilane
 Liquid chlorine (Cl)
 Chlorobenzene
 Chloroform  
 Silica based enamels

Floatation agents 
A range of chemical flotation agents for froth floatation processes:
 Dibutyl dithiophosphate
 Disobutyl dithiophosphate
 Sodium dithiophosphate etc.

Notes

References

External links
 Official website

Chemical companies of Russia
Companies based in Chuvashia
Soviet chemical weapons program
Renova Group
Chemical companies of the Soviet Union
Defence companies of the Soviet Union
Chemical warfare facilities
Companies formerly listed on the Moscow Exchange
Chemical companies established in 1960
1960 establishments in Russia